Aspergillus reticulatus is a species of fungus in the genus Aspergillus. It is from the Robusti section. The species was first described in 2017. It has been isolated from a lung biopsy in the United States, air in Puerto Rico and elsewhere in the United States, dust in Belgium, oil paintings in Slovenia, and a leather shoe in the Czech Republic. It has been reported to produce asperglaucide, aurantiamide, indole alkaloid A, and clavatol D.

References 

reticulatus
Fungi described in 2017